Fierarul River may refer to:

 Fierarul, a tributary of the Cormoș in Covasna County
 Fierarul, a tributary of the Pârâul Șeii in Covasna County

See also 
 Fieru River (disambiguation)
 Fieraru (surname)
 Fierăria River